Clothilde Magnan (born 5 March 1973) is a French fencer. She competed in the women's individual and team foil events at the 1996 Summer Olympics.

References

External links
 

1973 births
Living people
French female foil fencers
Olympic fencers of France
Fencers at the 1996 Summer Olympics
People from Boulogne-sur-Mer
Sportspeople from Pas-de-Calais